The New Mexico House of Representatives is the lower house of the New Mexico State Legislature.

There are 70 members of the House. Each member represents roughly 25,980 residents of New Mexico.

The most recent elections were held on November 8th, 2022.

Composition

Leadership

Current members

Past composition of the House of Representatives 

(The party control table shows the balance of power after each recent general election. The preceding Makeup table includes results of special elections since the last general election.)

See also

 New Mexico Legislature
 New Mexico Senate

References

External links
 New Mexico Legislature Official Government Website

New Mexico Legislature
State lower houses in the United States